Saved by the Bell: The New Class is an American teen sitcom that aired on NBC. The program first aired on September 11, 1993, and ran for seven seasons, with its final first-run episode airing on January 8, 2000. Saved by the Bell: The New Class anchored the Saturday morning TNBC lineup during its run.

Series overview

Episodes

Season 1 (1993)
The cast for the first season of Saved by the Bell: The New Class was:

 Robert Sutherland Telfer as Scott Erikson
 Isaac Lidsky as Barton "Weasel" Wyzell
 Jonathan Angel as Tommy "D" De Luca
 Bianca Lawson as Megan Jones
 Natalia Cigliuti as Lindsay Warner
 Bonnie Russavage as Vicki Needleman
 Dennis Haskins as Principal Richard Belding

Season 2 (1994)
The cast for the second season of Saved by the Bell: The New Class was:

 Bianca Lawson as Megan Jones
 Jonathan Angel as Tommy "D" De Luca
 Natalia Cigliuti as Lindsay Warner
 Christian Oliver as Brian Keller
 Sarah Lancaster as Rachel Meyers
 Spankee Rogers as Bobby Wilson
 Dustin Diamond as Screech Powers
 Dennis Haskins as Principal Richard Belding

Season 3 (1995)
The cast for the third season of Saved by the Bell: The New Class was:

 Jonathan Angel as Tommy "D" De Luca
 Natalia Cigliuti as Lindsay Warner
 Sarah Lancaster as Rachel Meyers
 Richard Lee Jackson as Ryan Parker
 Salim Grant as R.J. Collins
 Samantha Becker as Maria Lopez
 Dustin Diamond as Screech Powers
 Dennis Haskins as Principal Richard Belding

Season 4 (1996)
The cast for the fourth season of Saved by the Bell: The New Class was:

 Sarah Lancaster as Rachel Meyers
 Richard Lee Jackson as Ryan Parker
 Samantha Becker as Maria Lopez
 Ben Gould as Nicky Farina
 Lindsey McKeon as Katie Peterson
 Anthony Harrell as Eric Little
 Dustin Diamond as Screech Powers
 Dennis Haskins as Principal Richard Belding

Season 5 (1997)
The cast for the fifth season of Saved by the Bell: The New Class was:

 Richard Lee Jackson as Ryan Parker
 Samantha Becker as Maria Lopez
 Ben Gould as Nicky Farina
 Lindsey McKeon as Katie Peterson
 Anthony Harrell as Eric Little
 Ashley Lyn Cafagna as Liz Miller
 Dustin Diamond as Screech Powers
 Dennis Haskins as Principal Richard Belding

Season 6 (1998)
Seasons 6 and 7 of Saved by the Bell: The New Class were filmed together as a single production, so the cast for the sixth and seventh seasons of Saved by the Bell: The New Class was the same:

 Samantha Becker as Maria Lopez
 Ben Gould as Nicky Farina
 Lindsey McKeon as Katie Peterson
 Anthony Harrell as Eric Little
 Ashley Lyn Cafagna as Liz Miller
 Tom Wade Huntington as Tony Dillon
 Dustin Diamond as Screech Powers
 Dennis Haskins as Principal Richard Belding

Season 7 (1999–2000)
As season 7 was filmed together with season 6 as a single production, the cast remained the same for both.

References

External links
 
 

Lists of American sitcom episodes
Lists of American children's television series episodes
Saved by the Bell episodes